Hutchinson Farm is a historic farm in Elizabeth Township, Allegheny County, Pennsylvania.  The farmhouse was built in 1865 in a vernacular Victorian style. The farm is adjacent to the Van Kirk Farm, which is also listed on the National Register.

The Hutchinson Farm was listed on the National Register of Historic Places on February 19, 1986.

References

Buildings and structures in Allegheny County, Pennsylvania
Farms on the National Register of Historic Places in Pennsylvania
Historic districts on the National Register of Historic Places in Pennsylvania
National Register of Historic Places in Allegheny County, Pennsylvania